This is a list of Puerto Rico locations by per capita income. In 2017, Puerto Rico had a per capita income of $12,081 — lower than any state and one of the lowest in the United States. In 2017, Puerto Rico had a median household income of $19,775 — the lowest of any state or territory in the United States.

Puerto Rico is the only U.S. territory whose data is recorded annually in American Community Survey estimates (as if it were a state) — the other U.S. territories have their data recorded only once every 10 years.

Puerto Rico municipalities ranked by per capita income

Note: Puerto Rico does not have counties. The U.S. Census Bureau counts the 78 municipalities of Puerto Rico as county-equivalents.

Data for the municipalities of Puerto Rico is from the U.S. Census Bureau (2013-2017 American Community Survey 5-Year Estimates).  Most of the municipalities of Puerto Rico are among the lowest-income places in the United States. Adjuntas, Puerto Rico has the lowest median household income of any county or county-equivalent in the United States.

Per capita income ranges from $24,264 in Guaynabo to $5,943 in Maricao.

See also
List of lowest-income counties in the United States

References

United States locations by per capita income
Puerto Rico geography-related lists
Economy of Puerto Rico